Charlotte Louise Jackson (born 29 June 1978) is an English journalist and television presenter, who was formerly a presenter on Sky Sports News. She played lacrosse and tennis for Hampshire, while her mother played lacrosse for England.

Biography
Although she is from Portsmouth, she is a lifelong supporter of Liverpool as her family originated from the city. She spent much of her early years in Wickham, a village just north of Portsmouth.

Career
She was also a singer and backing vocalist and was a backing vocalist for Tony Christie for a TV appearance of his hit, "Is This the Way to Amarillo". She hosted the Barnardos Young Supporters Concert from 2005–2009, and participated in Catfight in 2007, a boxing match in Hammersmith Palais.

Broadcasting
In 2004 Jackson wrote and presented sports news for a variety of sports websites, including sportal.com, TEAMtalk, Football365 and Golf365 among other sports-related websites—where she wrote and presented sports bulletins. Jackson also presented the coverage of the National Hunt Festival for the official Cheltenham website in 2006.

She joined Setanta Sports News in 2007, co-hosting Lunchtime Live alongside Murray Dron, and presented various live events, including BetFred League of Legends darts tournament. She presented the Beijing Bulletin for Al Jazeera +3 Sport's coverage of the 2008 Summer Olympics, with Rhodri Williams.
In 2005 she appeared in Clarkson: Heaven and Hell as a dancer.

After the channel ceased broadcasting in June 2009, she joined Sky Sports in August 2009, presenting on Sky Sports News. She also regularly appears with Tim Shaw on his radio show, Absolution. She hosted the 2009 FIFA World Player of the Year Awards Ceremony in Zurich alongside Pedro Pinto. She appeared as a reporter in the Keith Lemon film.

Jackson presented Sky Sports Football quiz show Take it Like a Fan with John Fendley. The show is based on going to different British football league grounds and asking quiz questions.

She also presented the second series of ITV's 71 Degrees North alongside Paddy McGuinness, and was team captain for the girls for ITV's The Big Quiz—Sports Special.

In 2013, she was a contestant in ITV's celebrity diving show Splash!, where she reached the semi-finals, despite breaking a toe.

Personal life

She is married to former Sunderland and Wales manager Chris Coleman. She announced in June 2014 that they were expecting their first child and a son arrived on 22 December, followed by a daughter in 2016.

Andy Gray incident 
In late 2010, Sky Sports commentator Andy Gray and presenter Richard Keys were caught in a furore, when derogatory comments they made about female referees prior to a match were caught by a hot mic. Shortly after, footage emerged of more incidents of Gray engaged in sexist behavior, and consequently his contract was terminated by Sky.

References

External links
 Charlotte Jackson at TV Newsroom

1979 births
Living people
Mass media people from Portsmouth
Sky Sports presenters and reporters
21st-century English women singers
21st-century English singers
British women television journalists
Association footballers' wives and girlfriends